Edmund Rice may refer to:

Edmund Ignatius Rice (1762–1844), Catholic lay brother and founder of the Christian Brothers and Presentation Brothers
Edmund Rice (colonist) (1594–1663), English immigrant to the Massachusetts Bay Colony
Edmund Rice (politician) (1819–1889), U.S. Representative from Minnesota
Edmund Rice (Medal of Honor) (1842–1906), brigadier general, American Civil War Medal of Honor recipient, inventor of the Rice trowel bayonet

See also
Edward Rice (disambiguation)